The North Karo River drains the Indian state of Jharkhand.

It originates on the Ranchi Plateau. It drains the Gumla, Ranchi and West Singhbhum districts. It joins the South Koel near Serengda. The meandering valley of the Karo river, downstream from Pheruaghaugh falls is a typical example of an incised meander.

Koel-Karo project
The Koel-Karo project is located in the Ranchi and West Singbhum districts. The two dams will be linked by a trans-basin channel, with six units of 115 mW each in the underground powerhouse at Lumpu-ngkhel and one unit of 20 mW at Raitoli. About 120 villages are to be affected, displacing over one lakh (100,000) people. About  are to be submerged. Of the total land acquisition,  are reported to be agricultural land, while  comprise forests. Dispute arose over the compensation package for the displaced people and protests started in 1974 and have been continuing since then.

References

Rivers of Jharkhand
Rivers of India